Nam Nao National Park
is a protected area in Phetchabun Province in northern Thailand. The park is a large forest filled with pineries, grasslands, and jungle. The park is home to approximately 360 species of birds and 340 species of butterflies. The average annual temperature is 25 degrees Celsius (77°F). Between December and January temperatures drop to as low as 2-5 degrees Celsius (36-41°F). Nam Nao National Park is part of a Level I "tiger conservation unit" (TCU). It encompasses .

Geography
Nam Nao National Park with an area of 603,750 rai ~  is located in Lom Sak, Mueang Phetchabun and Nam Nao districts of Phetchabun province and Khon San district of Chaiyapum province. Most of the park consists of mountains covered with deciduous dipterocarp forest, hill evergreen forest, mixed deciduous forest, moist evergreen forest, pine forest and grasslands. The source of several rivers is in the park, which flows into the Chulabhorn reservoir.
The national park is neighbouring Phu Pha Man National Park and Phu Kradueng National Park to the north, abutting Pha Phueng Wildlife Sanctuary to the southeast and Phu Khiao Wildlife Sanctuary to the south, connected by Tat Mok National Park to the south and abutting Phu Pha Daeng Wildlife Sanctuary to the west.

History
On 12 January 1970 the National Park Board took a decision to designate a national park.
On 3 May 1972 the Revolutionary Council announced: determination of the Nam Nao forest area in Mueang Phetchabun district, Lom Sak district, Nam Nao district, Phetchabun province and Khon San district, Chaiyaphum province to be a national park.
The boundaries of the national park include also the area of Pak Chong Subdistrict and Tha Ibun Subdistrict of Lom Sak District, but they are not mentioned in the publication in the Government Gazette. So a Royal Decree, which mentions the two omitted subdistricts, was published in the Royal Gazette on 26 September 1982. Since 2002 this national park has been managed by Protected Areas Regional Office 11 (Phitsanulok)

Flora

Plants in the park are:

Flowers at Nam Nao N.P. include:

A rare ground orchid is: Eulophia flava

Fauna
The number of sightings in the park are:
Fifteen families of mammals, represented by one or two mammal species:

The park has approximately 360 species of birds, of which some 210 species of passerines from 40 families, represented by one bird species:

of which some 150 species of non-passerines from 30 families, represented by one bird species:

Twelve families of reptiles, represented by one reptile species:

Four families of amphibians, represented by one amphibian species:

At least there are 340 species of butterflies, which include:

Places
 Suanson Dong Paek - a pine forest.
 Suanson Phu Kum Kao - a pine forest at  height.

Location

See also
 List of national parks in Thailand
 List of Protected Areas Regional Offices of Thailand

References

External links

 Nam Nao National Park

National parks of Thailand
Ministry of Natural Resources and Environment (Thailand)
Phetchabun Mountains
Phetchabun province
Tourist attractions in Phetchabun province
Protected areas established in 1972
1972 establishments in Thailand